Chen Zhenggao (born March 1952) is a Chinese politician. He is best known for his terms as Minister of Housing and Urban-Rural Development, and governor of Liaoning province.

Biography
Chen was born in Haicheng, Liaoning Province, China. He was the mayor of Shenyang, the capital of Liaoning. In December 2005, he was appointed as the secretary of CPC's Shenyang City committee. On December 22, 2007, the standing committee of Liaoning people's congress accepted the request of resignation of Zhang Wenyue as the governor of Liaoning, and appointed Chen Zhenggao as the vice governor. The committee also decided Chen became the acting Governor of Liaoning people's government. 

In 2009, amidst the ongoing global financial crisis, Chen led a group of over 200 officials on a business trip to Japan, where they spent a total of 50 million yen (roughly $500,000US) on dining and related expenses.

In 2014, Chen was appointed the Minister of Housing and Urban-Rural Development replacing Jiang Weixin, and Li Xi succeeded him as Governor of Liaoning. He left office in 2017 upon reaching the mandated retirement age for minister level officials of 65.

He was an alternate member of CPC's 17th central committee and a full member of CPC's 18th central committee.

References

1952 births
Living people
Politicians from Anshan
Governors of Liaoning
Government ministers of the People's Republic of China
People's Republic of China politicians from Liaoning
Members of the 18th Central Committee of the Chinese Communist Party
Alternate members of the 17th Central Committee of the Chinese Communist Party
Dalian Maritime University alumni
Dongbei University of Finance and Economics alumni
Chinese Communist Party politicians from Liaoning
Mayors of Shenyang